Mine Falls Park is a  park in the city of Nashua, New Hampshire, United States. Located in the heart of the city, it was purchased in 1969 from the Nashua, New Hampshire Foundation with city and federal Land and Water Conservation Fund (LWCF) money. It is bordered on the north by the Nashua River and on the south by the millpond and power canal system.

History
The park encompasses  on both sides of the Everett Turnpike. The name "Mine Falls" dates from the 18th century, when low-quality lead was supposedly mined from the islands below the falls.

The first gates were built in 1826, and the gatehouse near Mine falls was built in 1886. The property was once owned by the Nashua Manufacturing Company, which harnessed the river's flow for power in its mills. The mills closed in 1948 and the owner Textron sold it to the Nashua New Hampshire Foundation. After that, the area was used for various commercial purposes, while the river suffered from severe pollution. A 1973 visit from the Environmental Protection Agency's Program to Photographically Document Subjects of Environmental Concern (DOCUMERICA) led to the creation of the Mine Falls Park master plan in 1974. In 1981, a regulation-sized soccer playing field was added to the park.

In 1981, a new footbridge over the Nashua River canal was built at the end of Whipple Street, allowing additional access to the playing field area. The playing area was later expanded to include additional fields for soccer. The trails provide a highway underpass and a bicycle and pedestrian path to cross the Nashua River.
In 1987, the Nashua River Canal and the Nashua Manufacturing Company Historic District (the Millyard) were placed on the National Register of Historic Places. In 1992, the park trails were designated part of the New Hampshire Heritage Trail system, which extends  along the Merrimack River from Massachusetts to Canada. In 1986, Mine Falls was commissioned to be the site of a small, city-owned hydroelectric dam with a capacity of three megawatts.

City officials had allowed an encampment of the homeless, known as "Maple Island", in the park. An attack on a homeless man in 2009 prompted renewed concern about it, and officials cleared the settlement. Some local homeless made a new camp on nearby private land.

Developments
As of April 23, 2022, the bridge across the canal near Nashua South High School is closed to both vehicles and pedestrians.  The bridge at the end of Whipple street remains open.

See also
1886 Mine Falls Gatehouse

References

 Map of the park on the City of Nashua, New Hampshire website
 Mine Falls Park on the Merrimack River Wildlife Heritage Trail website of the New Hampshire Fish and Game Department

Tourist attractions in Nashua, New Hampshire
Municipal parks in New Hampshire
Parks in Hillsborough County, New Hampshire